The 1994 Badminton Asian Cup was the second edition of Badminton Asian Cup. It was held in Beijing Gymnasium, Beijing, China from 14 to 18 June with total prize money of US$120,000. Chinese team won titles in both the singles events and mixed doubles while Indonesia and South Korea won the men's doubles and women's doubles title respectively.

Medalists

Medal table

Results

Semifinals 
The table below gives an overview of the semifinals results of 1994 Asian Cup.

Finals

References

Sources 
 New Straits Times, 17 June 1994, p. 46
 New Straits Times, 19 June 1994, p. 25

Badminton tournaments in China
1994 in badminton
1994 in Chinese sport
International sports competitions hosted by China